Arab al-Samniyya, also known as Khirbat al-Suwwana, was a Palestinian village in the Western Galilee that was captured and depopulated by Israel during the 1948 Arab-Israeli war. It was located in the Acre District of the British Mandate of Palestine, 19.5 km northeast of the city of Acre. In 1945 the, village had a population of 200 Arab and a total land area of 1,872 dunums.

History
The village was situated on a rocky hill near the road linking Ra's al-Naqura with Safad. Its houses were made of stone. A dirt path linked it to the coastal highway and thence to Acre. The villagers cultivated grain, figs, and olives. 

In  the  1945 statistics it had a population of 200 Muslims, with 1,872 dunams of land. Of this, a total of 174 dunams were allocated to grain crops; 22 dunums were irrigated and planted with orchards.

The village was captured by Israel's 7th and Carmeli Brigades on 31 October 1948 during the Israeli Defense Force offensive Operation Hiram. The village was completely destroyed and only building rubble left behind. Following the war the area was incorporated into the State of Israel and the village remained depopulated of its inhabitants. In 1950, the moshav of Ya'ara was established on its land.

See also
Depopulated Palestinian locations in Israel

References

Bibliography

External links
Welcome To 'Arab al-Samniyya
 'Arab al-Samniyya,  Zochrot
Survey of Western Palestine, Map 3:  IAA, Wikimedia commons 
Arab Al-Samniyya at Khalil Sakakini Cultural Center

District of Acre
Arab villages depopulated during the 1948 Arab–Israeli War
Former populated places in Israel